Paul O'Flynn may refer to:

Paul O'Flynn (Gaelic footballer) (born 1985), Irish sportsperson
Paul O'Flynn (journalist), (born 1985), Irish television reporter

See also
Paul Flynn (disambiguation)